The Klaas Smits River is a river part of the Great Kei River system in the Eastern Cape, South Africa. It originates south of Molteno and flows through Sterkstroom, first southwards and then southeastwards before joining up with the Black Kei River. Presently the Klaas Smits River is part of the Mzimvubu to Keiskama Water Management Area.

The Komani River is a tributary of the Klaas Smits, joining its left bank 5 km south of Queenstown.

The basin of this river saw much commando activity during the Second Boer War.

See also 
Great Kei River
List of rivers of South Africa

References

External links
The South African Military History Society - Military History Journal Vol 13 No 1
SA Estuarine Land-cover: Great Kei Catchment
Towns of historical interest in the 'kei

Rivers of the Eastern Cape